Vladimir Popov (born 23 January 1977 in Cahul) is a former male weightlifter from Moldova. He competed in two consecutive Summer Olympics for his native Eastern European country, starting in 1996. He is best known for winning the bronze medal in the men's featherweight division (– 62 kg) at the 2001 European Championships in Trenčín, Slovakia.

Popov was banned twice by the International Weightlifting Federation (IWF), in 2005 and 2008, for doping violation. It is believed that he is banned for life.

References

External links 
sports-reference

1977 births
Living people
People from Cahul
Moldovan male weightlifters
Weightlifters at the 1996 Summer Olympics
Weightlifters at the 2000 Summer Olympics
Olympic weightlifters of Moldova
Doping cases in weightlifting
Moldovan sportspeople in doping cases
Sportspeople banned for life
European Weightlifting Championships medalists
20th-century Moldovan people
21st-century Moldovan people